Smash is an American musical television show that premiered on NBC, Monday, February 6, 2012.

It was announced on June 9, 2011, that NBC had signed a deal with Columbia Records for a soundtrack of the series. The deal gave Columbia worldwide, digital and physical rights to the first season, with options to subsequent seasons. The deal included both original songs written for the series and any covers of songs featured on the show.

By the end of the first season, 36 studio recordings of the show's musical performances were released, 31 of them on iTunes and five with the deluxe edition of the first season soundtrack.

The first season soundtrack, The Music of Smash, was released on May 1, 2012. A deluxe edition, with additional songs, was available exclusively from Target until early 2013.

A second soundtrack album from the show, Bombshell, which serves as the "cast album" for Bombshell, the main show-within-the-show, was released on February 12, 2013, in standard and deluxe versions, the latter again exclusively from Target.

A third soundtrack album, The Music of Smash: The Complete Season 1, was released digitally exclusively by iTunes on May 21, 2013. It consists of 36 songs that had been previously released for Season 1, either as singles or on the previous soundtrack albums, including the deluxe Target edition of The Music of Smash (which is currently out of print).

A fourth soundtrack album, The Music of Smash: The Complete Season 2, was released digitally exclusively by iTunes on May 21, 2013. It consists of 51 songs: 48 from the second season and 3 from the first season - Ivy Lynn's version of "Never Give All the Heart" and demos of "Smash!" and "Second Hand White Baby Grand".

Performers

Season 1
Most songs in the first season are performed by the cast of Bombshell, which consistently includes Karen Cartwright (Katharine McPhee) and Ivy Lynn (Megan Hilty), and, at times, Michael Swift (Will Chase) and Rebecca Duvall (Uma Thurman).  Other main characters to sing include Tom Levitt (Christian Borle), Dev Sundaram (Raza Jaffrey), Frank Houston (Brian d'Arcy James), Ellis Boyd (Jaime Cepero), and Eileen Rand (Anjelica Huston).  Julia Houston (Debra Messing) and Derek Wills (Jack Davenport) have each been featured in choreography.  Minor cast members, such as Sam Strickland (Leslie Odom, Jr.), have given performances as well.  Various guest stars have appeared in the series, many of them giving vocal performances. These have included Nick Jonas as television star Lyle West, Bernadette Peters as Ivy's mother Leigh Conroy, Annaleigh Ashford as Lisa McMann, and Norbert Leo Butz as himself.

Season 2
Many of the same characters from the first season deliver performances in the show's second season, again with Karen Cartwright (Katharine McPhee) and Ivy Lynn (Megan Hilty) being the notable leads. Other vocal performers include Veronica Moore (Jennifer Hudson), Jimmy Collins (Jeremy Jordan), Kyle Bishop (Andy Mientus), Ana Vargas (Krysta Rodriguez), Leigh Conroy (Bernadette Peters), Tom Levitt (Christian Borle), Julia Houston (Debra Messing), Sam Strickland (Leslie Odom, Jr.), Terry Falls (Sean Hayes), Simon as JFK (Julian Ovenden), Daisy Parker (Mara Davi), unnamed actress playing young Marilyn (Sophia Anne Caruso) and ensemble members Bobby (Wesley Taylor) and Jessica (Savannah Wise). Liza Minnelli and Kathie Lee Gifford played themselves in cameos.

Songs

Season 1
In the first season, all original songs contain music and lyrics by Marc Shaiman and Scott Wittman, except one where indicated.

Season 2
The second season features original music from four different fictional musicals, Bombshell, Beautiful, Hit List and Liaisons, as well as ancillary songs written by the fictional songwriters behind Bombshell and Hit List. All of the songs have music and lyrics by Wittman and Shaiman, except for the songs from Hit List, which for the most part were written by a combination of other musical theater writers and contemporary rock singer-songwriters. The use of additional songwriters was done in part to "open up the sound" of Smash.

Notes
A ^ From episode credits
B ^ From the sheet music during the episode

Digital singles sales

References

External links
 The Futon Critic: Smash episode listings
 Amazon.com MP3 store: Smash cast songs
 ASCAP Database Music Search
 NBC.com Smash Music, Season 2 episode song information

 
Smash
Smash songs